Cape Neddick is a census-designated place (CDP) in the town of York in York County, Maine, United States. The population was 2,568 at the 2010 census. It is part of the Portland–South Portland–Biddeford, Maine Metropolitan Statistical Area.

Geography
Cape Neddick is located at  (43.169023, -70.617341). The CDP as defined includes all of the physical peninsula known as Cape Neddick, plus all of the unincorporated community of York Beach, which consists of two beaches, one on either side of Cape Neddick. The northern limit of the CDP is Cape Neddick Harbor, the western limit is Route 1, and the southern boundary is the border with York Harbor.

Cape Neddick Light, also known as Nubble Lighthouse, is the most distinctive feature of the community. Construction began in 1876 and cost $15,000. It was first illuminated on July 1, 1879. The lighthouse was originally red but has been painted white since 1902. The distinctive red house was also built in 1902. The lighthouse became automated in 1987.

Climate

Demographics

As of the census of 2000, there were 2,997 people, 1,340 households, and 897 families residing in the CDP. The racial makeup of the CDP was 98.26% White, 0.27% African American, 0.47% Asian, 0.10% Pacific Islander, 0.20% from other races, and 0.70% from two or more races. Hispanic or Latino of any race were 0.90% of the population.

There were 1,340 households, out of which 22.3% had children under the age of 18 living with them, 55.7% were married couples living together, 8.2% had a female householder with no husband present, and 33.0% were non-families. 27.2% of all households were made up of individuals, and 11.2% had someone living alone who was 65 years of age or older. The average household size was 2.24 and the average family size was 2.70.

In the CDP, the population was spread out, with 18.2% under the age of 18, 4.4% from 18 to 24, 23.9% from 25 to 44, 33.9% from 45 to 64, and 19.6% who were 65 years of age or older. The median age was 47 years. For every 100 females, there were 88.4 males. For every 100 females age 18 and over, there were 86.7 males.

The median income for a household in the CDP was $45,500, and the median income for a family was $52,796. Males had a median income of $42,386 versus $30,800 for females. The per capita income for the CDP was $33,788. About 2.2% of families and 5.6% of the population were below the poverty line, including 4.6% of those under age 18 and 5.2% of those age 65 or over.

Points of interest
There are two listings on the National Register of Historic Places for Cape Neddick. One is St. Peter's By-The-Sea Protestant Episcopal Church, and the other is Cape Neddick Light just off the coast.

Activities
Cape Neddick Country Club offers golfing on an 18-hole course designed by Donald Ross

History
Before 1655 Cape Neddick was inhabited by John Gooch, Peter Weare, Edward Wanton, Sylvester Stover and Thomas Wheelwright and their families.

Notable residents
 Phyllis Brooks, actress
 Peter Clines, writer
 Dawn Hill, state legislator
 Paul D. McGowan, state legislator

References

External links
 Cape Neddick Light (Nubble) - United States Lighthouses

Census-designated places in Maine
Portland metropolitan area, Maine
Census-designated places in York County, Maine
York, Maine
Populated coastal places in Maine